Toto is an American rock band from Los Angeles, California. Formed in 1977, the group's original lineup included lead vocalist Bobby Kimball, guitarist and vocalist Steve Lukather, keyboardist and vocalist David Paich, bassist David Hungate, keyboardist Steve Porcaro and drummer Jeff Porcaro. The current lineup features constant member Lukather, and lead vocalist Joseph Williams (who originally joined in 1986, and rejoined in 2010). The band also tours with several additional musicians, currently bassist John Pierce (since 2020), drummer Robert "Sput" Searight (since 2020), keyboardists Dominique "Xavier" Taplin (since 2018) and Steve Maggiora (since 2020), and multi-instrumentalist Warren Ham (since 2017, and originally from 1986 to 1988). Paich is still in the band, but medically unfit to tour.

History
Toto was formed in 1977 by vocalist Bobby Kimball, guitarist and vocalist Steve Lukather, keyboardist and vocalist David Paich, bassist David Hungate, keyboardist Steve Porcaro and drummer Jeff Porcaro. Hungate left after the recording of the band's fourth album Toto IV in 1982, with Mike Porcaro (brother of Steve and Jeff) taking his place. Kimball left two years later, with Lukather crediting his dismissal to increasing vocal problems stemming from his cocaine use. He was replaced by Dennis "Fergie" Frederiksen (who performed on Isolation before), and later Jean-Michel Byron. Byron remained for the promotional tour for the album ‘’Past to Present: 1977-1990’’, but did not get on with the rest of the band and left shortly thereafter, with no new frontman brought in to take his place. The band's constant drummer Jeff Porcaro died of a heart attack on August 5, 1992.  

After briefly considering disbanding, Toto returned to touring, with Los Angeles-based British drummer Simon Phillips replacing Jeff Porcaro. The group continued as a four-piece throughout much of the 1990s, before reuniting with Kimball, Williams and Steve Porcaro in 1998 for a tour in promotion of the 20th anniversary compilation Toto XX: 1977–1997. After the tour, Kimball remained with the band. The group returned to a lineup with two keyboardists in 2005 with the addition of Greg Phillinganes, who had previously toured with the band in place of Paich. Mike Porcaro was forced to retire in 2007 due to illness, with Leland Sklar filling in. In June 2008, Lukather announced that he had left Toto, signalling the disbandment of the group. Writing on his website, he explained that the band members "had some differences in how business was being done".

Less than two years after the band's breakup, it was announced in February 2010 that Toto would be reforming for a run of shows in benefit of Mike Porcaro, who had been diagnosed with amyotrophic lateral sclerosis. Lukather, Paich and Phillips were joined by former members Joseph Williams and Steve Porcaro, and touring bassist Nathan East. The group continued touring over the next few years, before Phillips left in January 2014 during the recording of Toto XIV and was replaced by Keith Carlock. Original bassist David Hungate also returned for the album's touring cycle, with Shannon Forrest taking over from Carlock. The next lineup of Toto included Joseph Williams, Steve Lukather, David Paich, Steve Porcaro, Shem von Schroeck, Shannon Forrest, Lenny Castro and Warren Ham.

Toto has featured a wide range of additional musicians as part of its touring lineup. Notable past members of the band's touring lineup include guitarist and backing vocalist Tony Spinner (from 1999 to 2008), keyboardist and backing vocalist John Jessel (from 1991 to 2004), bassist Leland Sklar (from 2007 to 2008, and in 2016), and backing vocalist Jenny Douglas-Foote (from 1990 to 1997, 2011 to 2012, and 2014 to 2016). Many of these additional musicians have also contributed to Toto's studio albums, both during their tenures and as guest contributors.

Current members

Official

Touring

Former members

Official

Touring

Session musicians

Musician timelines

Band member timeline

Touring musician timeline

Recording timeline

Lineups

References

External links
Toto official website

Toto